Something Wild is a 1986 American action comedy film directed by Jonathan Demme, written by E. Max Frye, and starring Melanie Griffith, Jeff Daniels and Ray Liotta. It was screened out of competition at the 1987 Cannes Film Festival.  The film has some elements of a road movie combined with screwball comedy.

Plot
Charlie Driggs is a conventional yuppie investment banker who works in New York City. After he leaves a greasy spoon diner without paying, a wildly dressed woman with a brunette bob who calls herself Lulu confronts him. Lulu offers Charlie a ride downtown but instead heads for New Jersey and throws his beeper from the moving car. Lulu openly drinks liquor while driving and stops in a town to buy more. While Charlie phones his office, Lulu — unbeknownst to him — robs a liquor store.

Charlie claims the cash he is carrying is for his Christmas club account, but Lulu persuades him to pay for a room at a roadside motel. Once inside she handcuffs him to the bed. She phones his boss and puts the receiver to his head while they are having sex, forcing him into an awkward conversation. Later Charlie pretends to phone his wife but Lulu is unaware that his marriage ended nine months ago.

After sharing a meal with Lulu at an Italian restaurant, Charlie realizes he is unable to pay with what little cash he has left. Lulu leaves him with the check, forcing him to flee the restaurant to escape an angry chef who demands payment. After spending the night at a motel, Lulu and Charlie awaken to find a police officer and tow truck near the car she drove down an embankment and into a signpost the night before. Lulu abandons the car and buys one from a sleazy used car dealer, leaving Charlie wondering where she got the money. He starts to enjoy Lulu's free-wheeling lifestyle and realizes he is falling in love with her.

Lulu confesses that her real name is Audrey and introduces Charlie as her husband to her mother, Peaches, at her Pennsylvania home. She appears as a demure blonde, having removed her brunette wig. She takes Charlie to her high school reunion, where a former classmate recognizes him as his office colleague. Audrey's violent ex-convict husband, Ray Sinclair, also appears and makes clear that he wants her back. After ditching his date, Ray takes Audrey and Charlie along while he robs a convenience store. He pistol-whips a clerk and breaks Charlie's nose. They drive to a cheap motel, where Ray forces Charlie to admit his wife left him (having learned this from Charlie's colleague at the class reunion). Realizing Charlie has deceived her, Audrey stays behind with Ray.

Despite Ray warning him to stay away from him and Audrey, Charlie secretly tails the couple as they leave the motel. Charlie confronts Ray in a Virginia restaurant with several police officers seated nearby and threatens to reveal Ray's parole violations unless he allows Audrey to leave with him. He demands that Ray hand over his wallet and car keys and leaves the check with Ray to force him to stay behind as they flee. Ray is saved from this dilemma by a shop girl he had met earlier.

Charlie takes Audrey to his Stony Brook, Long Island, home, but their idyllic suburban retreat is literally shattered when Ray hurls a patio chair through their sliding glass door. He severely beats Charlie and handcuffs him to the pipes under the bathroom sink before attacking Audrey. Charlie frees himself by pulling the pipes apart and strangles Ray with the handcuffs. During the scuffle, Charlie retrieves Ray's dropped knife. Ray dies when he accidentally impales himself on the knife Charlie is holding. Audrey is taken away for questioning when the police arrive.

Charlie later quits his job and looks for Audrey at her apartment, but finds she has moved. Outside the diner where Charlie met Audrey, a waitress accuses him of leaving without paying. Audrey suddenly appears with the cash he left on the table in her hand. She invites Charlie into her woodie station wagon and back into her life.

Cast

Reception
Something Wild was acclaimed by critics. The film holds a 91% approval rating on Rotten Tomatoes based on 45 reviews, with an average rating of 7.40/10. The website's critical consensus reads: "Boasting loads of quirky charm, a pair of likable leads, and confident direction from Jonathan Demme, Something Wild navigates its unpredictable tonal twists with room to spare." On Metacritic, the film has a weighted average score of 73 out of 100, based on 14 critics, indicating "generally favorable reviews".

Chicago Sun-Times film critic Roger Ebert rated the film 3-stars-out-of-4, and stated "Something Wild is quite a movie. Demme is a master of finding the bizarre in the ordinary. The accomplishment of Demme and the writer, E. Max Frye, is to think their characters through before the very first scene. They know all about Charlie and Lulu, and so what happens after the meeting outside that restaurant is almost inevitable, given who they are and how they look at each other. This is one of those rare movies where the plot seems surprised at what the characters do." Chicago Tribune film critic Dave Kehr gave the film a perfect four star review, stating "It's not every day that someone goes Alfred Hitchcock one better, but in Something Wild, Jonathan Demme has done it."

Home media
Something Wild was released on VHS by HBO Video on July 15, 1987. The film was released on DVD by MGM on June 5, 2001, presented in its original 1.85:1 widescreen aspect ratio. The only special feature was the original theatrical trailer.

On May 10, 2011, Something Wild was released by The Criterion Collection on DVD and Blu-ray. The Blu-ray has a new, restored high-definition digital transfer, supervised by director of photography Tak Fujimoto and approved by director Jonathan Demme. It also features new video interviews with Demme and writer E. Max Frye, the original theatrical trailer, and a special booklet featuring an essay by film critic David Thompson.

Soundtrack

The film's soundtrack was released on LP and CD, featuring only 10 of the 49 tracks in the title credits.  Notable omissions from the CD were the school reunion songs performed by The Feelies (including "Fame" and "I'm a Believer"), and The Troggs' "Wild Thing" (which gave the film its title and which was sung in the convertible scene).

Track listing
"Loco De Amor (Crazy For Love)" by David y Celia – 3:45
"Ever Fallen In Love" by Fine Young Cannibals – 3:48
"Zero, Zero Seven Charlie" by UB40 – 3:48
"Not My Slave" by Oingo Boingo – 4:23
"You Don't Have To Cry" by Jimmy Cliff – 3:57
"With You Or Without You" by Steve Jones – 4:46
"Highlife" by Sonny Okosun – 3:40
"Man With A Gun" by Jerry Harrison – 4:32
"Temptation" by New Order – 3:28
"Wild Thing" by Sister Carol – 4:05

Charts

Accolades

See also
 List of American films of 1986
 After Hours - 1985 black comedy thriller film with a similar theme
 Desperately Seeking Susan - 1985 comedy-drama film with a similar theme
 Who's That Girl - 1987 screwball comedy film with a similar theme

Notes

References

External links
 
 
 
 

Something Wild: Wild Things an essay by David Thompson at the Criterion Collection

1986 films
1980s action comedy-drama films
1980s crime comedy-drama films
1980s road movies
1980s romantic comedy-drama films
Adultery in films
American action comedy-drama films
American crime comedy-drama films
American independent films
American road movies
American romantic comedy-drama films
Class reunions in popular culture
Culture of Tallahassee, Florida
Edgar Award-winning works
1980s English-language films
Films scored by John Cale
Films directed by Jonathan Demme
Films set in New Jersey
Films set in New York City
Films set in Pennsylvania
Films shot in Florida
Films shot in New York City
Orion Pictures films
1986 independent films
1980s American films